Jalabala Vaidya (born 12 August 1936) is one of India's leading stage actresses. She is best known for her one-woman performance of The Ramayana which is her husband, Gopal Sharman's contemporary dramatic interpretation of the Sanskrit epic. This Ramayana, subtitled 'the epic; as a play in English' is the only Indian production to this day to have played on Broadway. Jalabala Vaidya, Gopal Sharman and their daughter Anasuya Vaidya, are the founders and directors of The Akshara Theatre –  non-profit arts institution in New Delhi, India.

The Ramayana
The Ramayana has been performed by Jalabala more than 2000 times to rave reviews all over the world – including on Broadway in New York; at the Smithsonian Institution in Washington DC; at the Sadler's Wells Theatre, one of Britain's National Theatres in London; at the National Theatres of Canada and Finland; and at numerous other prestigious venues, like the United Nations Headquarters in New York, where it received a  standing ovation.  It has been received by superlative critical notices, both in India and abroad. Jalabala portrayed all 22 characters in the powerful two-hour performance.

In India, The Ramayana and other Akshara productions have played to packed houses and superlative Press and audience reactions in all parts of the country – making the Akshara perhaps one of the widest-traveled and viewed Indian theatre companies. From the Music Academy, Chennai, to the Tata Theatre of the National Centre for the Performing Arts, Mumbai, to the Siri Fort Auditorium in New Delhi – from Patiala and Amritsar to Kolkata and Kottayam, to performances in schools, colleges and factories, the Akshara has made an impact on the Indian artistic environment. 
  
Sumati Gangopadhyay writing for the Indian Express, Baroda, said:
“Watching Jalabala’s impassioned enactment of Gopal's script has been the experience of a lifetime. Indeed, this is more than a stage show. It falls into the category of a revelatory experience. Strangely, mystically, this Ramayana suddenly brings you to a moment of truth—and you are left stunned. No one with any interest in the arts, or even his or her own salvation, can afford to miss this play.”

Now Jalabala opens and closes the play and the rest of it is performed by actors from the Akshara Theatre Repertory.

Early life and career
Jalabala was born in London, daughter of a half English-half Italian mother, Madge, a concert singer, and Indian journalist, author and freedom fighter, Suresh Vaidya. She began school at St.Paul's, London then at Queen Mary High School, Mumbai. She graduated from Miranda House, Delhi University with an English Honours Degree standing third in the University where she was also actively involved in theatre. Vaidya began her career as a journalist at Link Magazine in New Delhi which was where she first met Gopal, who, at the time, worked there as an arts critic.

Vaidya's first international theatrical success came in Rome at the Teatro Goldoni where she performed Full Circle written by Gopal Sharman who was also present at the reading. The due soon embarked on a series of successful theatrical seasons on London’s West End, and performance tours all over Europe. The British MP and columnist for The Sunday Times, Tom Driberg, said of Jalabala: “She performs exquisitely.” The critic of The Times, London was equally ecstatic and likened her to Isadora Duncan.

Jalabala Vaidya also produces, performs in and narrates most of her husband’s highly acclaimed television films. To name some for which she is best known: India Alive, The Kashmir Story, The Sufi Way, Gitanjali and Gandhi’s Gita a play about Mahatma Gandhi’s translation of the Bhagavad Gita into simple Gujarati and how he and his wife Kasturba went through the final revision in the Himalayan foothills.

The Akshara Theatre, New Delhi
Jalabala and her husband, Gopal Sharman, are co-founders of the Akshara National Classical Theatre in New Delhi, India. The Akshara is a non-profit society, an arts complex designed and built by Sharman, where she has played the lead role in more than 20 plays. Registered as a society in 1980 under the name The Akshara National Classical Theatre of India, the theatre’s endeavour is to present theatre, music and dance in its various spaces on a nightly basis for a ticket paying audience in an effort to create a sustainable artistic model. The Akshara works towards fostering interaction between the diverse cultures of India and the world through the performing arts.

In addition to performances the Akshara runs the Diksha Programme of Training in Indian classicism, with year-long classes and workshops in the Indian performing arts for children and adults, as well as the popular, annual 5-week Diksha Summer Festival for children.

Accolades
The Akshara’s founders, Gopal Sharman and Jalabala Vaidya, have been recipients of various awards and honours such as the Sangeet natak Akademi’s Tagore Award, the Homi Bhabha Fellowship Award, the Delhi Natya Sangh Award, Andhra Pradesh Natya Akademi Honour, and the Bharatiya Vidya Bhavan Honour. They were also made Honorary Citizens of the City of Baltimore, in the United States, when they played there. Jalabala also received the Alumni Honors Award from Miranda House in 2006.                                                                                
 
Jalabala enjoys her time painting, writing poetry and scripts, spending time with her family- most of whom work at the Akshara-while acting  and teaching highly specialized acting classes at the Akshara and is the author of three books: Be, a collection of short stories, and two collections of poetry, This is Full and That is Full.

References

1936 births
British stage actresses
Indian stage actresses
Living people
Delhi University alumni
Actresses from Delhi
20th-century Indian actresses